The men's 4 × 50 metre medley relay competition of the 2018 FINA World Swimming Championships (25 m) was held on 15 December 2018.

Records
Prior to the competition, the existing world and championship records were as follows.

Results

Heats
The heats were started at 09:30.

Final
The final was held at 19:00.

References

Men's 4 x 50 metre medley relay